Down Royal Racecourse is a horse racing venue near Lisburn in Northern Ireland. The most valuable race run there is the Ladbrokes Champion Chase, run at the Northern Ireland Festival of racing in November. The most valuable flat race to be run there annually is the Ulster Derby.

Racing has been
taking place on the current course, at Maze near Lisburn, since, the early 18th
Century on land donated by Arthur Hill, 1st Marquess of Downshire, but the
history of Down Royal goes further back to 1685 when King James II issued a
Royal Charter and formed the Down Royal Corporation of Horse Breeders. In 1750
King George II donated £100 to run King's Plate and to the present day a race
named Her Majestys Plate is run in July over 1 mile 5 furlongs with the prize money contributed to by the Privy Purse.

Although actually in the United Kingdom, racing at Down Royal comes under the authority of Horse Racing Ireland as horse-racing in the British Isles is divided on a Great Britain / All-Ireland basis.

In October 2018 a dispute arose between the owners, Merrion Property Group, and the track operators, Down Royal Corporation of Horse Breeders. The Corporation announced that it would cease operations at the end of 2018 while Merrion, stated that they would run the course from 1 January 2019. Some reports suggested that the course would close. In January 2019 the operation of the course passed to Merrion Property Group.

Notable races

References

External links
Website

 
Sports venues in County Antrim
Sports venues in County Down
Sport in Lisburn
Buildings and structures in Lisburn